The IEEE Electromagnetics Award was established by the IEEE Board of Directors in 1996.  This award is presented for outstanding contributions to electromagnetics theory, application or education.

It may be presented to an individual only.

Recipients of this award receive a bronze medal, certificate and honorarium.

Recipients 
 2023: John Bandler
 2022: Arthur D. Yaghjian
 2021: Constantine A. Balanis
 2020: Tapan Kumar Sarkar
 2019: Richard W. Ziolkowski
 2018: Tatsuo Itoh
 2017: Weng Cho Chew
 2016: Giorgio Franceschetti
 2015: Donald Wilton 
 2014: Allen Taflove
 2013: Leung Tsang
 2012: Nader Engheta
 2011: Yahya Rahmat-Samii
 2010: Thomas B. A. Senior
 2009: Kenneth K. Mei
 2008: Werner Wiesbeck
 2007: Carl Edward Baum
 2006: Raj Mittra
 2005: Clayton R. Paul
 2004: Jin Au Kong
 2003: Leopold B. Felsen
 2002: Robert C. Hansen
 2001: Fawwaz T. Ulaby
 2000: Roger F. Harrington
 1999: Robert E. Collin

References

External links 
 Information on the award at IEEE

Electromagnetics Award